The local cuisine in Xuzhou is a blend of many of the flavours of northern and southern China, as a result of the location of Xuzhou. It is known for a number of dishes, including those below, and various dog meat dishes.

Xuzhou's cuisine tends to be high in fat and salt. Restaurants use a lot of oil and salt in their cooking, including vegetable dishes and soups. Meat is often very fatty, and it tends to be chopped up with the bones still in it.

In the history of Jiangsu diet culture, Xuzhou cuisine not only occupies an extremely important position but also is one of the birthplaces of the whole Chinese food culture. It reflected the earliest Chinese cooking theory and witnessed the formation of the Chinese cuisine.

Context 
China covers a vast geographic area with 56 nationalities, hence a variety of Chinese food with different but fantastic and mouthwatering flavor. Each area has a distinct style of cooking, for example, northern Chinese food is salty, simple, fewer vegetables with wheat as the staple food; Western China food is hearty halal food with lamb the main meat, etc1.

Xuzhou in China's Jiangsu Province, also known as Pengcheng, has more than 3000 years history. It is in a special geographic area, which located in the line of the Qinling -Huaihe (the line separated north and south of eastern China) and also is the junction of Beijing, Shanghai, Longhai and other railways.

List of notable dishes 

Others include:
Ground pan is originating from the traditional cooking method of farmers of Xuzhou. By putting chicken, fish and other articles into an iron pan and cooking it on an oven with wood. When the water in the pan boils, then sticking the bread on the pan edge. It is similar to braising chicken/ fish in sauce. The taste is salty and spicy, and both the soup and bread are very delicious.
Luomo (baked bread) is made by the unfermented flour. With a thickness of about 0.1 cm, it can be rolled into a kind of snack or subsidiary foodstuff. It has a smooth feeling and is better to eat with Sangza, which is a kind of fried food and similar to the crisp noodle.
Lamb Soup—the Fu Yang Festival is the most popular activity, which is starting on the day of Chufu (around mid-July depends on the lunar calendar)

References

Bibliography

“From Xuzhou into the South.” TWIF World Indoor Championship 2018

Wenlu, RunSheng. "Wa Yu’ Research." 彭城周末--徐州日报社多媒体数字报, 04 Feb. 2012
Wu, Xinhai. “Xuzhou Cuisine.” JSCchina, 14 Dec. 2011, 10:52

Xuzhou
Xuzhou